The Pir Bakran mausoleum is a historical mausoleum in Pir Bakran, the capital of Pir Bakran District. The mausoleum dates back to the Ilkhanid era. The names of The Rashidun Caliphs on its inscriptions show that the building belongs the early times of the conversion of mongols to islam and they were still sunnite. The courtyard of the mausoleum is surrounded by walls, small iwans and the arched portals of the main iwan and decorated by some inscriptions with Kufic scripts and stuccoes with the form of flowers and bushes, which are the works of Mohammad Naghash. Mohammad ebn-e Bakran's grave is located behind the courtyard. On the northern side of it, there's a small closed room, which was probably his teaching place. The mausoleum is decorated with stuccoes and tiles.

References

Further reading 
 

Mausoleums in Iran
Buildings and structures in Isfahan Province
Tourist attractions in Isfahan Province